Wendy Kelly  is an American lawyer and officer in the United States Army Reserves.
In 2004 Kelly was an Assistant United States Attorney.
In 2005 Kelly was appointed the director of operations of the Office of Military Commissions 

In 2008 an email from Kelly was submitted at hearings of several military commissions in an attempt to show that the Guantanamo military commissions Convening Authority had been involved in the composing the charges against Khadr and five other Guantanamo captives.

References

Guantanamo Bay attorneys
Living people
Year of birth missing (living people)